"When I'm Gone" also commonly known by its longer title "You're Gonna Miss Me When I'm Gone", is a popular song written by A. P. Carter and was recorded in 1931 by the Carter Family (not to be confused with their 1928 song "Will You Miss Me When I’m Gone?").

Versions
The song was later recorded by J. E. Mainer's Mountaineers and by Charlie Monroe.

Adaptations
In 2009, the band Lulu and the Lampshades combined the song "When I'm Gone" with a common children's game known as the Cup game, in which cups are tapped and hit on a table to create a distinct rhythm. This created the modern version of the song known as "Cups (When I'm Gone)" or alternately "When I'm Gone (Cups)".
In 2011 Anna Burden uploaded a version of the song on YouTube that then went viral. 
 In 2012,  the movie Pitch Perfect included a rendition of the song sung by   Anna Kendrick, based on Burden's version.  The Kendrick version was released on the soundtrack in 2013 and became a charting hit in the United States, and other charts. It also served as the official song of the 2013 CONCACAF Gold Cup.

References

External links 

Songs written by A. P. Carter
Carter Family songs